Rated-RKO was a professional wrestling tag team in World Wrestling Entertainment (WWE) consisting of Edge and Randy Orton, with Lita as their manager for a short while. The team's name was created by combining Edge's nickname, "The Rated-R Superstar", with Orton's initials, RKO, which is also the name of his finishing move.

Edge and Orton formed an alliance in October 2006 to challenge the team of Triple H and Shawn Michaels, collectively known as D-Generation X (DX), whom Rated-RKO felt were preventing them from becoming world champions. Rated-RKO would succeed in defeating DX, giving the latter their first loss since their reunion in June 2006. The following month, Rated-RKO won the World Tag Team Championship. Soon after, Lita left the group due to her real-life retirement.

In January 2007, Rated-RKO lost the World Tag Team Championship, which caused tension between the two. The group officially disbanded in May 2007, after Edge moved to the SmackDown! brand. Edge and Orton had occasional reunions until Edge's first retirement in 2011. Edge returned from a nine-year retirement at the 2020 Royal Rumble, and seemingly was set to reunite Rated-RKO as he and Orton formed an alliance in the Royal Rumble match. Orton further hinted a revival the next night on Raw, only to attack Edge afterwards.

History

World Tag Team Champions (2006–2007)
On the October 2, 2006, episode of Raw, interference from the newly reformed D-Generation X (DX) (Triple H and Shawn Michaels) tag team cost Edge his shot at the WWE Championship held by John Cena in a Steel Cage match. This led to Edge approaching Randy Orton and asking him to join forces with him to "get rid of DX". In his stand, Edge explained to Orton why he should join him as a tag team partner, as he cited Orton's lack of success after being kicked out of Evolution (Orton's former group), as well as the antics of DX taking up television time that he felt should rightfully go to the younger stars.

Edge and Orton, calling themselves "Rated-RKO", immediately became very outspoken against DX and began mocking them at every opportunity, including a sketch reminiscent of the ones DX did about their opponents on a usual basis. This led to a tag team match on November 5, 2006, at Cyber Sunday with the fans choosing the special guest referee. At Cyber Sunday, the duo defeated DX, handing them their first team loss since they reunited when Eric Bischoff (the fan selected referee) allowed the use of a steel chair without calling for a disqualification. Later in the night, Lita won the Women's Championship in the finals of a seven-woman tournament. The following night on Raw, Edge and Orton faced Ric Flair and Roddy Piper for the World Tag Team Championship with Eric Bischoff as the guest referee. Rated-RKO lost the match, following help from DX.

The following week on Raw however, they won the World Tag Team Championship from Flair and Piper in a rematch when they attacked Piper upon making his entrance, with Edge delivering a one man con-chair-to to Piper. As he was taken to the locker room by paramedics, Flair was forced to defend the titles by himself, and Rated-RKO won the match after Edge performed a spear on Flair. The real reason for the sudden switch was later revealed to be Piper's diagnosis of lymphoma forcing him out of action. On the November 20 episode of Raw, Rated-RKO, Big Show and Kenny lost to Triple H, Shawn Michaels, John Cena and Ric Flair.

At Survivor Series, Lita legitimately retired after losing the Women's Championship to Mickie James and left the group in the process. Later that night, Team Rated-RKO, consisting of Rated-RKO along with Johnny Nitro, Mike Knox, and Gregory Helms, were swept by Team DX (DX, Jeff Hardy, Matt Hardy, and CM Punk) with Orton being the last member eliminated in a ten-man elimination match. The night after Survivor Series, Edge and Orton beat Ric Flair until he was bloody and continued to beat him after dragging him to the ring, knowing that DX had already left the building. In doing so, D-X claimed they had made their rivalry "personal". On the December 4 episode of Raw, Rated-RKO and MNM defeated DX and The Hardys. On the December 18 episode of Raw, Rated-RKO and Umaga battled to a no contest against John Cena and DX after Cena and Umaga battled to the back. After the match, Edge and Orton attacked DX giving Michaels a double RKO on a steel chair and two con-chair-tos to Triple H on the announce table. At New Year's Revolution in January 2007, Rated-RKO retained the World Tag Team Championship after fighting with DX to a no-contest in a match that saw Triple H suffer a legitimate torn right quadriceps muscle. The next night on Raw, Rated-RKO held a victory celebration and Shawn Michaels came out to the stage to confront Edge and Orton setting up a 2-on-1 handicap match the following week.

With Triple H out of action, Rated-RKO continued their on-screen rivalry with remaining DX member Shawn Michaels. They were able to schedule a two-on-one handicap match against Michaels, during which he was able to beat the odds and defeat both men, leaving Orton lying in the ring after a one-man con-chair-to as Edge stood and watched at ringside. On the January 22 episode of Raw, Edge defeated Michaels in a street fight with help from Orton. At the Royal Rumble, both members of Rated-RKO made it to the final four in the Royal Rumble match (they both were eliminated by Michaels) where The Undertaker won the match. The next night on Raw, the duo lost the World Tag Team Championship to the impromptu team of John Cena and Shawn Michaels. On the February 15 episode of Raw, Rated-RKO, Mr. Kennedy and MVP lost to John Cena, Shawn Michaels, The Undertaker and Batista. Internal dissension continued as both men laid claim to being the number one contender to the WWE Championship, and Edge walked out on Orton on the February 26 episode of Raw during a rematch for the World Tag Team Championship due to miscommunication.

The relationship strained further after both men qualified for the WrestleMania 23 Money in the Bank ladder match, which would grant the winner a championship match. For weeks Edge influenced various authority figures into putting Orton in matches that would cause Orton not to succeed.

Breakup and subsequent reunions (2007–2011)
On the April 16, 2007 episode of Raw, they reunited to take on John Cena in a handicap match but lost the match due to interference from Michaels. At Backlash, the two were involved in a Fatal Four-Way match for the WWE Championship along with Michaels and Cena. Cena ended up retaining the title after pinning Orton. On the April 30 episode of Raw, Edge and Orton met in a one-on-one match. Edge won the match by pinning Orton following a spear. Edge then moved to the SmackDown! brand on the May 11 episode of SmackDown!, after cashing in the Money in the Bank briefcase (which he had won from Mr. Kennedy on the May 7 episode of Raw) to win the World Heavyweight Championship from The Undertaker. With this move, Rated-RKO was officially disbanded. During Raw's 15th Anniversary episode on December 10, Rated-RKO reunited for "one night only" to partake in a six-man tag team match, teaming up with Umaga to face the members of Orton's former group Evolution (Triple H, Batista, and Ric Flair). They lost the match after being disqualified.

The team had a reunion on the April 21, 2008 episode of Raw, when Orton and Edge teamed with John "Bradshaw" Layfield (JBL) and Chavo Guerrero Jr. to take on John Cena, Triple H, The Undertaker, and Kane in a winning effort.

On the April 26, 2010, episode of Raw, Edge cost Orton (who had turned face after feuding with his former group The Legacy) a number-one contender's match by spearing him during a triple threat match against Batista and Sheamus. Orton and Edge faced off at Over the Limit in May, though Orton dislocated his right shoulder and the match concluded with a double countout.

On the January 28, 2011 episode of SmackDown, Edge and Orton reunited in a winning effort against Dolph Ziggler and The Miz. On the February 18 episode of SmackDown, they reunited once again and teamed up with John Morrison, R-Truth, Rey Mysterio Jr., and John Cena to defeat Kane, Ziggler, Sheamus, CM Punk, Drew McIntyre, and Wade Barrett in a 12-man tag team match. On the April 11 episode of Raw, Edge announced his retirement due to a neck injury preventing him from being medically cleared.

Later interactions (2020–2021)
On January 26, 2020, at the Royal Rumble pay-per-view, Edge returned from injury, wrestling for the first time since 2011, then reuniting with Randy Orton to eliminate The O.C. (Luke Gallows and Karl Anderson). The following night on Raw, Orton would interrupt Edge, attacking him with the RKO and then deliver a Con-Chair-To, a move Rated-RKO used in their run as a tag team, thus turning Orton heel in the process. They would face each other in a Last Man Standing match at WrestleMania 36, which was won by Edge and a singles one–on–one match at Backlash, which was won by Orton. Wrestling Observer Newsletter reported that the match was pre-recorded on June 8, while the rest of the Backlash card aired live on June 14. The pre-recorded nature of the Edge vs. Randy Orton match allowed WWE to utilize "unique production techniques and camera angles." One production technique was amplified crowd noise. WWE also used the classic Madison Square Garden microphone that was used during WrestleMania I, with previous recordings of the late Howard Finkel doing introductions for both wrestlers. Referee Charles Robinson also wore a classic light blue ref shirt with black bowtie.
WWE then billed the match as "The Greatest Wrestling Match Ever."

The next year, at Royal Rumble, they participated in the Royal Rumble match as the first two entrants, with Edge entering at #1 and Orton entering at #2. Both would last until the final two where Edge eliminated Orton to win the match. Edge subsequently defeated Orton the next night on Raw one last time to end their feud.

Championships and accomplishments
World Wrestling Entertainment
World Tag Team Championship (1 time) – Edge and Randy Orton
WWE Women's Championship (2 times) – Lita

See also 
 RK-Bro

References

External links
Edge's WWE Alumni profile
Randy Orton's WWE profile
Lita's WWE Alumni profile

WWE teams and stables
WWE World Tag Team Champions